Chanoch may refer to:
 Chanoch Henoch Bornsztain (died 1965), Polish-born rabbi
 Chanoch Henoch Eigis (1863–1941), Lithuanian rabbi
 Chanoch Ehrentreu (born 1932), German-born rabbi
 Chanoch Nissany (born 1963), Israeli-born Hungarian racing driver
 Chanoch Dov Padwa (1908–2000), Galicia-born rabbi

See also 
 Enoch (disambiguation)